Manabe (written: 真鍋, 眞鍋 or 間部) is a Japanese surname. Notable people with the surname include:

, Japanese daimyō
, Japanese daimyō
, Japanese manga artist
, Japanese television personality and model
, Japanese weightlifter
, Japanese field hockey player
, Japanese volleyball player
, Japanese composer
, Japanese meteorologist and climatologist
, Japanese politician
, Japanese rock guitarist

See also
6193 Manabe, a main-belt asteroid

Japanese-language surnames